The 1989 Volta a Catalunya was the 69th edition of the Volta a Catalunya cycle race and was held from 2 September to 8 September 1989. The race started in L'Hospitalet and finished in Platja d'Aro. The race was won by Marino Lejarreta of the Paternina team.

General classification

References

1989
Volta
1989 in Spanish road cycling
September 1989 sports events in Europe